Caparaonia is a genus of the lizard in family Gymnophthalmidae. The genus is monotypic, i.e. it has only one species, Caparaonia itaiquara. It is endemic to Brazil and is known from the Caparaó National Park on the border between Minas Gerais and Espírito Santo states.

References

Gymnophthalmidae
Monotypic lizard genera
Endemic fauna of Brazil
Reptiles of Brazil
Taxa named by Miguel Trefaut Rodrigues
Taxa named by José Cassimiro
Taxa named by Dante Pavan
Taxa named by Felipe F. Curcio
Taxa named by Vanessa Kruth Verdade
Taxa named by Kátia Cristina Machado Pellegrino